The Rodenbach is a stream, just under  long, and an orographically left-hand headstream of the Eisbach in the northeastern part of the Palatine Forest in the German state of Rhineland-Palatinate.

See also 
List of rivers of Rhineland-Palatinate

References 

North Palatinate
Palatinate Forest
Tributaries of the Eisbach (Rhine)
Rivers of Rhineland-Palatinate
Rivers of Germany